The Lotus International Character Set (LICS) is a proprietary single-byte character encoding introduced in 1985 by Lotus Development Corporation. It is based on the 1983 DEC Multinational Character Set (MCS) for VT220 terminals. As such, LICS is also similar to two other descendants of MCS, the ECMA-94 character set of 1985 and the ISO 8859-1 (Latin-1) character set of 1987.

LICS was first introduced as the character set of Lotus 1-2-3 Release 2 for DOS in 1985. It is also utilized by 2.01, 2.2, 2.3 and 2.4 as well as by Symphony. It was also utilized in a number of third-party spreadsheet products emulating the file format. LICS was superseded by the Lotus Multi-Byte Character Set (LMBCS) introduced by Lotus 1-2-3 Release 3 in 1989.

Character set

Codepoints 20hex (32) to 7Fhex (127) are identical to ASCII (as well as to LMBCS). For some characters the table also lists dedicated Lotus 1-2-3 compose key sequences to ease character input beyond the Alt Numpad input method.

See also
 Lotus Multi-Byte Character Set (LMBCS)
 DEC Multinational Character Set (MCS)
 BraSCII

References

Further reading
 (May help retrieving info on LICS.)

Lotus 1-2-3 Release 2.x User Guide Appendix A. (NB. Reportedly contains info on LICS.)
The file LICS.EAT ("Extended ASCII Table") in Lotus 1-2-3 Release 2.x for DOS reportedly contains detailed info on LICS.
The Lotus Symphony 1.2 and Notes 2.1 Character Translation File (CTF) LICS850.CTF and the Notes 3.0 Country Language Services (CLS) file L_LICS.CLS contain LICS character translation information.
 (NB. Temporarily left here for quick reference, but contains somewhat confused info.)
https://sourceforge.net/p/libwps/code/ci/master/tree/src/lib/libwps_tools_win.cpp (Contains a LICS to Unicode conversion routine, which, however, is buggy)

Computer-related introductions in 1985
Character encoding
Character sets
Lotus Software software